Morris Rosenfeld (Yiddish: מאָריס ראָסענפֿעלד; born as Moshe Jacob Alter; December 28, 1862 in Stare Boksze in Russian Poland, government of Suwałki – June 22, 1923 in New York City) was a Yiddish poet.

His work sheds light on the living circumstances of emigrants from Eastern Europe in New York's tailoring workshops.

He was educated at Boksha, Suwałki, and Warsaw. He worked as a tailor in New York and London and as a diamond cutter in Amsterdam, and settled in New York in 1886, after which he was connected with the editorial staffs of several leading Jewish newspapers. During the 1890s he wrote song parodies for the Yehuda Katzenelenbogen Music Publishing Company in New York, including Nokhn ball (After the Ball), Di pawnshop (Faryomert farklogt) and Nem tsurik dayn gold (Take Back Your Gold) - all published in Di idishe bihne and Lider magazin. In 1904 he published a weekly entitled Der Ashmedai. In 1905 he was editor of the New Yorker Morgenblatt. He was also the publisher and editor of a quarterly journal of literature (printed in Yiddish) entitled Jewish Annals.

Rosenfeld was the author of Di Gloke [The bell] (New York, 1888), poems of a revolutionary character; later the author bought and destroyed all obtainable copies of this book. His collected poems were published under the title Gezamelte Lieder, in New York, in 1904.

Works

 "Di gloke" (The Bell), Poetry collection, 1888
 "Di blumenkette" (The Chain of Flowers), Poetry collection, 1890
 "Lider-bukh", Poetry collection
 First English edition: Songs from the Ghetto. Translated by Leo Wiener. New York, 1898
 First German edition: Lieder des Ghetto (songs from the ghetto). Translated by Berthold Feiwel. Calvary, Berlin, 1902
 "Shriftn", selected works in six volumes, New York, 1908–1910
 "Geveylte shriftn", New York, 1912
 "Dos bukh fun libe", 1914
Songs of Labor and Other Poems. Translated by Rose Pastor Stokes and Helena Frank. Boston: Richard G. Badger, 1914.

Rosenfeld's work on Youtube

References

 Poet of the ghetto. Morris Rosenfeld. Hrsg. von Edgar J. Goldenthal. Ktav, Hoboken NJ 1998,  (enthält eine Auswahl der Werke)
 Tzum hundertstn Geboirntog fun Morris Rosenfeld. Zamlung. Hrsg. von Nachman Meisel. YKUF, New York, 1962 (enthält eine Auswahl der Werke)
 Bibliography of Jewish Encyclopedia: American Jewish Year Book, 1904-5 by Cyrus Adler, Frederick T. Haneman

External links
 
 
 
 JewishEncyclopedia
 Two poems by Rosenfeld translated from Yiddish into English by Alice Stone Blackwell
  translation of Rosenfeld's Requiem for the victims of the Triangle Shirtwaist Factory fire, published in the Jewish Daily Forward 
 Guide to the Papers of Morris Rosenfeld, held at YIVO Institute for Jewish Research, New York
 Songs from the Ghetto, free download
songs from the Ghetto, scanned copy, 1900 edition, from the National Library of Israel

1862 births
1923 deaths
American people of Polish-Jewish descent
American male poets
Jewish American poets
Yiddish-language poets
Emigrants from the Russian Empire to the United States